Ululodes arizonensis is a species of owlfly in the tribe Ululodini. It is found in Central America and North America.

References

Further reading

 

Myrmeleontidae
Articles created by Qbugbot
Insects described in 1907